Berfin Altun (born 1 November 1999) is a Turkish weightlifter competing in the women's –71 kg division. She is a member of Kocaeli Büyükşehir Belediyesi Kağıt Spor Kulübü.

Major results
Altun became silver medalist in the  Clean and jerk event and in total at the 2016 European Junior & U23 Weightlifting Championships held in
n Eilat, Israel. At the 2018 European Junior & U23 Weightlifting Championships in Zamość, Poland, she captured the gold medal in the 69 kg Clean& Jerk event. In 2019, she took the silver medal in the 71 kg Clean & Jerk event and the bronze medal at the Junior World Weightlifting Championships in Suva, Fiji. At the 2019 European Junior & U23 Weightlifting Championships in Bucharest, Romania, she won the bronze medal in the -64 kg Snatch event, and gold medals in the Clean & Jerk event, and became champion. She won the bronze medal in the Clean and jerk event at the 2021 European Weightlifting Championships held in Moscow, Russia.

References

External links
 

1999 births
Living people
Sportspeople from İzmit
Turkish female weightlifters
Kocaeli Büyükşehir Belediyesi Kağıt Spor athletes
21st-century Turkish sportswomen
Islamic Solidarity Games competitors for Turkey
Islamic Solidarity Games medalists in weightlifting